Redland City Bulletin is a newspaper published in the City of Redland, Queensland, Australia. It is published weekly from Cleveland and is owned by Australian Community Media.

History
The newspaper commenced on 2 July 2014 following the amalgamation of the Redland Times and Bayside Bulletin. Part of Fairfax Media, it was acquired in July 2018 by Nine Entertainment following a merger. In April 2019, Nine Entertainment sold most of the newspapers it acquired through the merger (including Redland City Bulletin) to Australian Community Media.

References

External links
 

Newspapers published in Queensland
Redland City
Cleveland, Queensland
2014 establishments in Australia
Publications established in 2014
Weekly newspapers published in Australia